Corkscrew Peak is a peak in the Grapevine Mountains in Death Valley National Park. It is named for its shape, which loosely looks like a corkscrew.

Climbing 

The trail starts from Daylight Pass Road. Its length is 5.8 kilometers. It follows a wash for about 3 kilometers, then a small canyon, and finally, a steep (25% average) ridge to the summit.

References 

Mountains of the Mojave Desert
Mountains of Death Valley National Park
Death Valley
Mojave Desert